Marten River is an unincorporated hamlet located in the municipality of Temagami, in the District of Nipissing, Ontario, Canada. The latest census 2005 puts the town population at 87. Marten River is considered the gateway to the Temagami area. It is named after the nearby river.

The main industry is mining, logging and outdoors tourism.

The area has many good lakes for fishing including: Marten Lake, Ingall Lake, Olive Lake and Jumping Cariboo Lake off the old Ferguson Highway.

Ontario Northland motor coaches stop at the Trapper Trading Post on the North Bay–Hearst route.

References
Temagami - Ontario Highway 11 Homepage

Communities in Nipissing District
Localities of Temagami